Vanttausjärvi is a medium-sized lake in the Kemijoki main catchment area. It is located in Rovaniemi town in the region of Lapland in Finland .

See also
List of lakes in Finland

References

Lakes of Rovaniemi